Walter Riddell Sutherland (19 October 1890 – 4 October 1918), also known as Wattie Suddie, was a Scotland international rugby union player.

Early life

Sutherland was the son of Alexander and Isabella Sutherland of the Imperial Hotel in Hawick, Roxburghshire. He was educated at Teviot Grove Academy before training to be a sanitary inspector in Hawick. He also played cricket and football and was a champion runner, winning the Scottish Borders title at multiple distances.

Rugby Union career

Amateur career

He played for Hawick RFC.

Provincial career

Sutherland played for the South of Scotland in 1910.

International career

He gained 13 caps playing for the Scotland national rugby union team between 1910 and 1914 and was regarded as the best Scottish wing threequarter of his day.

Military career

The outbreak of the First World War put end to his rugby career, and he served with the Lothians and Border Horse, later the Argyll and Sutherland Highlanders and finally the Seaforth Highlanders. Second Lieutenant Sutherland was killed in France on 4 October 1918, aged 27, just five weeks before the armistice. He is buried at the Houchin British Cemetery in Pas-de-Calais.

References

External links
 "An entire team wiped out by the Great War".  The Scotsman, 6 November 2009

1890 births
1918 deaths
Argyll and Sutherland Highlanders officers
British Army personnel of World War I
British military personnel killed in World War I
Hawick RFC players
Lothians and Border Horse officers
Rugby union players from Hawick
Scotland international rugby union players
Scottish rugby union players
Seaforth Highlanders officers
South of Scotland District (rugby union) players
Rugby union wings